Blue Mountains is a 1983 Georgian comedy-drama directed by Eldar Shengelaia.  The film is about a passive young man Soso (Ramaz Giorgobiani), an author, entering the Soviet-controlled bureaucracy of Georgia attempting to get his novel published only to be neglected and compartmentalized at every turn. The film was selected for screening as part of the  section at the 2014 Cannes Film Festival.

Plot
Novelist Soso (Ramaz Giorgobiani) goes to his publishing house in an attempt to find someone interested in publishing his latest manuscript. The employees shuffle the author's manuscript around their office from person to person, but everyone seems to be too busy to actually read it. Soso ultimately discovers that the employees are wrapped up in anything but their direct duties and responsibilities so much that not even a giant structural flaw in the building can get their attention. The movie is an allegory of Soviet-time bureaucracy and Soviet system as a whole. At the end of the film, the house collapses and the employees move to another, brand new and modern building. However, that does not mean they change their attitude towards their work ...

Cast
 Ramaz Giorgobiani as Soso - writer.
 Vasil Kakhniashvili as Vaso
 Teimuraz Chirgadze as Director
 Ivane Sakvarelidze as Markscheider
 Sesilia Takaishvili as cashier
 Grigol Natsvlishvili 
 Vladimer Mezvrishvili 
 Otar Guntsadze 
 Darejan Sumbatashvili 
 Zeinab Botsvadze 
 Nino Tutberidze
 Giorgi Chkhaidze
 Mikheil Kikodze
 Guram Lortkipanidze
 Guram Petriashvili

Music
Music is Composed by Giya Kancheli.

References

External links

Blue Mountains in footagenetwork.com

1983 films
1983 comedy-drama films
Soviet comedy-drama films
Georgian-language films
Kartuli Pilmi films
Films directed by Eldar Shengelaia
Soviet-era films from Georgia (country)
Comedy-drama films from Georgia (country)